The 1828 United States presidential election in Tennessee took place between October 31 and December 2, 1828, as part of the 1828 United States presidential election. Voters chose 11 representatives, or electors to the Electoral College, who voted for President and Vice President.

Tennessee voted for the Democratic candidate, Andrew Jackson, over the National Republican candidate, John Quincy Adams. Jackson won Tennessee, his home state, by a wide margin of 90.38%.

Results

References

Tennessee
1828
1828 Tennessee elections